A Lesson Before Dying is Ernest J. Gaines' eighth novel, published in 1993. It was nominated for the Pulitzer Prize and won the National Book Critics Circle Award. The novel is based on the true story of Willie Francis, a young Black American man best known for surviving a failed  electrocution in the state of Louisiana in 1946.

Plot summary
In the late 1940s backdrop of a small Cajun community, Jefferson, a young black man, is accused and convicted of a murder for perpetrating a shoot-out in a liquor store which left three men killed. Being the sole survivor of a crime that occurred unwittingly, Jefferson is sentenced to death. The story unfolds his search for justice as within his trial, Jefferson's attorney explains to the jury "What justice would there be to take his life? Justice, gentlemen? Why, I would as soon put a hog in the electric chair as this." Jefferson's godmother, Miss Emma Glenn, and Tante (Aunt) Lou, the aunt of local school teacher Grant Wiggins, ask Lou's nephew Wiggins to turn Jefferson from a "hog" to a "man." However, in order to accomplish this they must first get permission from Sheriff Sam Guidry. They successfully ask Sheriff Guidry's brother-in-law Henri Pichot, whose family Miss Emma served for years, for assistance. Wiggins, who left his hometown for tertiary education, has returned from university to teach locally. Whilst Wiggins takes the job in contemplation of whether to maintain his position or to completely move away from the place of his childhood, both Jefferson's godmother and his aunt successfully persuade him to go on a prison-visit and impart wisdom to Jefferson before his death. Over the course of the novel, Grant and Jefferson unexpectedly form a close friendship as the two men both come to comprehend the importance of resistance and defying conformity. As they understand compassion, human struggles and existential revelations through their newfound brotherhood, Grant also forms a bond with the white Deputy Paul Bonin. In early February, it is announced that Jefferson will be executed soon, on April 8. Around then, Reverend Ambrose becomes concerned that Grant, an agnostic, is not teaching Jefferson about God and thus begins to visit him regularly to reverse Grant's spiritual impartments. The conflict reaches a head when Grant buys Jefferson a radio, which the seniors in the black community, or "quarter," see as sinful. The novel ends with the anti-climax of Jefferson's death by execution and, much to Grant's surprise, a visit from Paul in which he tells Grant that "Jefferson was the strongest man in that crowded room".

Point of view
The book provides perspective on the status of African Americans in the South after World War II and before the Civil Rights Movement. It shows the Jim Crow American South through the eyes of a formally educated African American teacher who often feels helpless and alienated from his own country. In the novel, Grant is the only educated black man in the area and the only member of the black community who might be considered capable of becoming free of overt oppression. The character feels his life and career choices are severely limited due to racial prejudices, an example of this in the novel being his instinct to refer to white male authority figures as "Sir". In order to break away from his social conditions, Grant's yearning to escape this situation heightens over time throughout the story. Grant feels that he is cornered by myriad forces: his aunt's incessant desires, pressures to conform to a fundamentalist religion that he does not believe, the children's needs to fulfil his role as a teacher, and the community's craving for proper leadership.

Setting

Time period
The context of the novel can be depicted in Chapter 12 when the writer mentions Jackie Robinson. The quote, "All three stood talking baseball. Jackie Robinson had just finished his second year with the Brooklyn Dodgers," indicates that the story takes place in early October 1948, a time that dates the darkest histories of race relations for African Americans.

School/church
The writer draws the novel's focus on the challenges of religious education. Grant, an agnostic, spends most of his time in the church on the Henry Pichot Plantation.  The school that he teaches in is the same place in which the town gathers on Sunday morning for praise and worship.  Grant is continually challenged with the fact that he feels he is an outsider in his place of work; he does not attend church with the rest of his settlement. Despite Grant's personal atheism, much of the black culture and community focus on religion. Throughout the entire novel, this school is seen as a place of discrimination.

Bayonne
Bayonne is an actual city in France, but also the fictional Louisiana town where the generation is set before the Civil Rights movement in the South, depicted in the novel.

Title
The title of this novel refers to Grant's attempts to teach Jefferson a lesson. In order for Grant to be able to show Jefferson how to ‘become a man,’ he must understand the meaning himself before imparting his learning to another person. In the novel, the butterfly acts as a symbol towards the end as proof that both of these men have succeeded in their goals to be spiritually transcended.

“…I watched it fly over the ditch and down into the quarter, I watched it until I could not see it anymore.  Yes, I told myself. It is finally over.”
At this point Grant realizes that Jefferson truly did learn a ‘lesson before dying.’ When he says “It is finally over,” he is not only referring to Jefferson's life, but states it as a double entendre that also acknowledges his cowardly nature before enlightenment is “finally over.”  The character has fully taken a stand for what he believes in.  This insures that he, too, has benefited from this entire experience. Jefferson's life was sacrificed in order for the white people in the community to gain a better understanding of the value of the black members in all societies.

Awards and nominations
1993 National Book Critics Circle Award for Fiction
October 1997 choice of Oprah's Book Club

Film, TV or theatrical adaptations
On May 22, 1999 HBO premiered A Lesson Before Dying, which subsequently received two Emmy Awards for Outstanding Television Movie and Outstanding Writing for a Mini-Series or Movie (South African writer Ann Peacock) and a Peabody Award. Don Cheadle portrays Grant, Mekhi Phifer portrays Jefferson, and Cicely Tyson is featured as Tante Lou.

A play by Romulus Linney and a Southern Writers' Project, based on the novel and having the same title, had its world premiere at the Alabama Shakespeare Festival in January 2000 and Off-Broadway in September 2000. Rooted Theater Company (East New York, Brooklyn) staged a production of A Lesson Before Dying in June 2017.

References

External links
 Article/essay on "Women and Community in A Lesson Before Dying
Ernest J. Gaines: A Lesson Before Dying, Stuttgart 2008;  
A Lesson Before Dying at SparkNotes

Ernest J. Gaines : The biography of a famous black author, Thinkquest.org
Ernest Gaines, African American Literature Book Club
, "Race Relations in the 1930s and 1940s", Library of Congress

1993 American novels
Novels by Ernest J. Gaines
Peabody Award-winning broadcasts
American novels adapted into plays
American novels adapted into films
African-American novels
Novels about teachers
Novels set in Louisiana
National Book Critics Circle Award-winning works